Chris Nkulor (died 22 April 2014) was a Nigerian film actor. He was known for his roles in the Nollywood films  Battle of Indemnity, Hidden Treasure and Hidden Treasure 2.

Nkulor died on 22 April 2014 at the Obafemi Awolowo University hospital from a kidney ailment.

References

External links

2014 deaths
Year of birth missing
Deaths from kidney failure
Nigerian male film actors